The 2019 Italian Mixed Curling Championship was held from November 17, 2018 to March 17, 2019 in two stages: the group stage (round robin) November 17–18, 2018 and February 16–17, 2019 and the playoff stage from March 16 to 17, 2019.

Four teams took part in the championship.

The winners of the championship were the team Team Virtus Mixed (skip Stefano Perucca), who won the team Magica Fireblock (skip Denise Pimpini) in the final. The bronze medal was won by the team Sporting Club Pinerolo (skip Lorenzo Maurino), who won the bronze match against the team Jass On The Rocks (skip Alberto Arienti).

Teams

Round robin
(Qualificazione - Girone unico)
Was held in Pinerolo at November 17–18, 2018 and February 16–17, 2019

Playoffs
(Finale)
Was held in Pinerolo from March 16 to 17, 2019

1 vs. 2
March 16, 15:00

3 vs. 4
March 16, 15:00

Semifinal
March 16, 20:30

Bronze-medal match
March 17, 10:30

Final
March 17, 10:30

Final standings

References

See also
2019 Italian Men's Curling Championship
2019 Italian Women's Curling Championship
2019 Italian Mixed Doubles Curling Championship
2019 Italian Junior Curling Championships

Curling competitions in Italy
Italian Mixed Curling Championship
Italian Mixed Curling Championship

Curling
Curling